Robert Terrence Flagler (born September 24, 1964) is a former professional American football running back in the National Football League (NFL) for the San Francisco 49ers and Phoenix Cardinals. He played college football at Clemson University.

Early years
Flagler attended Fernandina Beach High School, where as a senior he posted 1,683 rushing yards on 200 carries and 20 touchdowns, including one of the greatest games in Northeast Florida high school history, when against West Nassau (October 23, 1981) he had 405 rushing yards and 7 touchdowns. He also practiced basketball and led the district in scoring as a senior.

College career
He accepted a scholarship from Clemson University and became a full-time starter until his senior season. He helped the team win an ACC championship, while finishing with 1,258 rushing yards (13th in nation), 10 touchdowns, six 100-yard rushing games (including 2 games with over 200 rushing yards), 274 all purpose yards in one game (school record), 106.9 rushing yards per game in one season (school record). He was a runner-up in the ACC Player of the Year voting.

In 2013, he was inducted into the Clemson Athletic Hall of Fame.

Professional career

San Francisco 49ers (first stint)
Flagler was selected by the San Francisco 49ers in the first round (25th overall) of the 1987 NFL Draft. In three years he only had 42 carries for 145 yards and one touchdown, while playing behind Roger Craig.

After asking for a trade, he was sent along with Daniel Stubbs, a third (#81-Craig Veasey) and an eleventh-round (#304-Myron Jones) draft pick to the Dallas Cowboys, in exchange for a second (#47-Dennis Brown) and third-round (#68-Ron Lewis) draft choices on April 19, 1990.

Dallas Cowboys
A week after Flagler was acquired by the Dallas Cowboys to improve the running game, the team selected future hall of fame running back Emmitt Smith in the 1990 NFL draft. He was waived on September 2, 1990.

Phoenix Cardinals
On September 26, 1990, he was signed as a free agent by the Phoenix Cardinals for depth purposes, after Ron Wolfley was lost for the year. On August 12, 1991, he was traded to the San Francisco 49ers in exchange for a conditional draft choice (not exercised).

San Francisco 49ers (second stint)
Flagler was cut on August 26, 1991, when the San Francisco 49ers chose to keep veteran Spencer Tillman.

Phoenix Cardinals
On September 12, 1991, he was re-signed after starter Larry Centers was lost for the year with a broken foot. He was released on October 29.

Los Angeles Raiders
On July 19, 1992, he was signed by the Los Angeles Raiders as a free agent. He was waived on August 24.

Jacksonville Tomcats (AF2)
In 2000,  he signed with the Jacksonville Tomcats of the Arena Football League 2. He was switched to wide receiver and played until the team folded in 2003.

References

\

1964 births
Living people
People from Fernandina Beach, Florida
Players of American football from New York City
Players of American football from Florida
All-American college football players
American football running backs
Clemson Tigers football players
Phoenix Cardinals players
San Francisco 49ers players
Jacksonville Tomcats players